Glass cloth is a textile material woven from glass fiber yarn.

Home and garden
Glass cloth was originally developed to be used in greenhouse paneling, allowing sunlight's ultraviolet rays to be filtered out, while still allowing visible light through to plants. 

Glass cloth is also a term for a type of tea towel suited for polishing glass. The cloth is usually woven with the plain weave, and may be patterned in various ways, though checked cloths are the most common. The original cloth was made from linen, but a large quantity is made with cotton warp and tow weft, and in some cases they are composed entirely of cotton. Short fibres of the cheaper kind are easily detached from the cloth.

In the Southern Plains during the Dust Bowl, states' health officials recommended attaching translucent glass cloth to the inside frames of windows to help in keeping the dust out of buildings, although people also used paperboard, canvas or blankets. Eyewitness accounts indicate they were not completely successful.

Use in technology
Due to properties of glass such as heat resistance and an inability to ignite, glass has been used to create fire barriers in hazardous environments such as inside of racecars. Its poor flexibility, and its being a source of skin irritation, made the fibers inadequate for apparel uses. 

Its bi-directional strength make glass cloth useful for some fiberglass reinforced plastics
. For example, the Rutan VariEze homebuilt aircraft uses a moldless glass cloth - epoxy composite structure and skin. Glass cloth is commonly used as the reinforcing lattice for pre-pregs.

See also 
 G-10 (material)
 Glass fiber

References 

Woven fabrics
Linens
Fiberglass 
Composite materials
Fibre-reinforced polymers
Glass applications